Elene Lete Para (born 7 May 2002) is a Spanish professional footballer who plays as a goalkeeper for Liga F club Real Sociedad and the Spain women's national team.

Club career
Elene Lete started her career at Urola.

References

External links
Profile at Real Sociedad

2002 births
Living people
Women's association football goalkeepers
Spanish women's footballers
Sportspeople from Gipuzkoa
Footballers from the Basque Country (autonomous community)
Real Sociedad (women) players
Primera División (women) players
People from Goierri